Emilia Cruz (born 1993) is a Mexican-American artist known for her oil and acrylic paintings depicting women of color in nature.

Biography 
Emilia Cruz was born in 1993 in San Diego, CA and raised in Simi Valley, CA. She currently resides in Ventura County, CA. As a child, she traveled back and forth to Tijuana, B.C., Mexico to visit family. Emilia attended Atherwood Elementary School and Royal High School. She is pursuing a BA in Illustration at the Art Center College of Design in Pasadena, CA. While studying, she teaches classes to young artists between the ages 3–12 at Plaza de La Raza located in Lincoln Heights, Los Angeles, CA.

Notable art 
Cruz was commissioned by CNN en Español for 'Proyecto Ser Humano''' and Netflix series Gente-fied . One of her best-known paintings is titled Am I too dark?.

 SPARC, Venice, CA, When She Rises (2018) 
Emilia Cruz’s artwork was featured in the When She Rises exhibition at SPARC in Venice, CA in 2018. The theme of the exhibition revolves around social justice and ecology, and its relation to the artist and their community.

 Netflix Series “Gente-fied” (2019) 
Emilia Cruz’s artwork was commissioned to be a part of the Netflix series 'Gente-fied' in 2019. Cruz’s artwork were the paintings that Ana Morales, the main character, paints in the series. Her main role was to create paintings of fictional characters.

 CNN en Español, “Proyecto Ser Humano” (2019) 
In 2019, Emilia Cruz was commissioned by CNN en Español to create a painting for “Proyecto ser Humano”''. Her painting was expected to demonstrate diversity, inclusion, and solidarity.

References

Further reading 
Barajas, Julia. “L.A.'s Eastside Is a Latino 'Ellis Island.' but It's Time Hollywood Branched Out.” Los Angeles Times. Los Angeles Times, June 13, 2021. https://www.latimes.com/entertainment-arts/tv/story/2021-06-13/latino-gap-netflix-gentefied-on-my-block-boyle-heights-east-la.
Schou, Solvej. “Illustration Student Emilia Cruz Pours Herself into Her Paintings and Her Art on Netflix's 'Gentefied'.” ArtCenter College of Design. ArtCenter, November 5, 2020. https://www.artcenter.edu/connect/dot-magazine/articles/emilia-cruz-illustration-netflix-gentefied.html.
“We Asked Artists to Illustrate Their Love for Selena in Larger-than-Life Murals, Here's What They Created.” Mitú. Netlifx, April 12, 2021. https://wearemitu.com/wearemitu/entertainment/artists-illustrate-their-love-for-selena-in-larger-than-life-murals/.
Valdivia, Pablo. “21 ‘Gentefied’ behind-the-Scenes Facts Straight from the Cast.” BuzzFeed. BuzzFeed, February 27, 2020. https://www.buzzfeed.com/pablovaldivia/behind-the-scenes-gentefied-facts.
La Prensa Texas. “Emilia Cruz - about the Cover Artist.” La Prensa Texas, February 17, 2020. https://laprensatexas.com/emilia-cruz-2/.

External links 

Wikipedia Student Program
Living people
American artists of Mexican descent
Hispanic and Latino American artists
21st-century American women artists
Hispanic and Latino American women in the arts
American women painters
1993 births